Hong Kong Macau Interport is an annual association football match between Hong Kong and Macau. The matches are hosted by the two alternatively each year.

Results

Winners Table

See also
Hong Kong national football team results – unofficial matches

References

 
Hong
Macau